Gustav Albert Peter (21 August 1853, in Gumbinnen – 4 October 1937, in Göttingen) was a German botanist.

In 1874 he received his doctorate from the University of Königsberg, and later on, worked as a curator at the botanical garden in Munich. From 1888 to 1923 he was a professor at the University of Göttingen, where he also served as director of the botanical garden.

From 1913 till 1919 he collected plants in German South-West Africa, South Africa and especially German East Africa, then later in 1925/26 he was engaged in another botanical expedition in Africa. In 1936 his herbarium of roughly 50,000 plants was acquired by the Berlin-Dahlem Botanical Garden and Botanical Museum. The plant genus Peterodendron (family Achariaceae) was named in his honor by Hermann Otto Sleumer, in 1936.

Peter's daughter Hedwig was married to Leo Rosenberg.

Published  works 
In the 1890s, he made contributions regarding the plant families Compositae, Convolvulaceae, Hydrophyllaceae and Polemoniaceae to Engler and Prantl's Die Natürlichen Pflanzenfamilien. With Carl Nägeli he published a two-volume work on the genus Hieracium, titled Die Hieracien Mittel-Europas (Hieracium of Central Europe; 1885–89). Other noted works by Peter include:
 Flora von Suedhannover nebst den angrenzenden Gebieten (Göttingen, 1901, 2 volumes) – Flora of southern Hanover and adjacent areas.
 Wasserpflanzen und sumpf gewachse in Deutsch-Ostafrika (Berlin, 1928) – Aquatic and marsh plants of German East Africa. 
 Flora von Deutsch-Ostafrika (Berlin, 1929–38) – Flora of German East Africa.

References

1853 births
1937 deaths
People from Gusev
People from East Prussia
University of Königsberg alumni
Academic staff of the University of Göttingen
Botanists active in Africa
19th-century German botanists
20th-century German botanists